Joyce Fairbairn  (November 6, 1939 – March 29, 2022) was a Canadian senator and was the first woman to serve as the leader of the Government in the Senate.

Early life and education
Born in Lethbridge, Alberta on November 6, 1939, Fairbairn was the daughter of Mary Elizabeth (née Young) and Lynden Eldon Fairbairn, a judge of the District Court of Alberta, lawyer, and Liberal candidate for the 1935 and 1940 federal elections in Lethbridge. She was a teenage journalist when she was a student at Lethbridge Collegiate Institute, and wrote a column entitled "Teen Chatter" in the Lethbridge Herald. She attended the University of Alberta where she earned a bachelor's degree in English and Carleton University where she earned a degree in journalism. She married Michael Charles Frederick Gillan in 1967; he died in 2002.

Political life 
Fairbairn worked as a journalist in the Parliamentary Press Gallery in Ottawa before being hired as a legislative assistant to Prime Minister Pierre Trudeau in 1970. In 1981, she became Communications Coordinator in the Prime Minister's Office. On June 29, 1984, just prior to leaving office, Trudeau recommended her for appointment as a Liberal senator for Alberta, her home province. Over the years as a senator, she held a number of positions within the Liberal Party, including Vice-Chair of the National as well as the Western and Northern Liberal Caucus from 1984 to 1991, and Co-Chair of the National Campaign Committee for her party in 1991.

When the Liberals returned to power after the 1993 election, Prime Minister Jean Chrétien appointed Fairbairn to the cabinet as Government Leader in the Senate, the first female senator in the post, and Minister with special responsibility for Literacy. She served in cabinet until 1997, after which she took on the role as Special Advisor on Literacy to the Minister of Human Resources and Skills Development.  She also chaired the Standing Senate Committee on Agriculture and Forestry, and the Special Senate Committee on the Anti-terrorism Act. She sat on the Senate Committee on Agriculture and Forestry until June 2012.

Fairbairn became involved with the Paralympics movement in Canada as early as 1998. That year, to counter a funding shortfall, she spearheaded fundraising efforts to send a Canadian team to compete in the 2000 Paralympic Games in Sydney through "Friends of the Paralympics", a group that grew and became "a strong political and fundraising voice for the Canadian Paralympic Movement". By 2000, she co-founded and chaired the Canadian Paralympic Foundation, the first official charitable foundation connected to the Canadian Paralympic Committee, to secure long-term financial support for Paralympic athletes and the committee. In recognition of her role in promoting and supporting Paralympic sports across the country, she was inducted to the Canadian Paralympic Hall of Fame as a builder in 2011.

In August 2012, it was reported that Fairbairn has taken indefinite sick leave from the Senate due to the onset of Alzheimer's disease. It was subsequently revealed that Fairbairn had been declared legally incompetent in February but had continued voting in the Senate until June. The Fairbairn case has led to calls for the Senate to establish rules to address similar situations should they arise in the future. It was announced on November 30, 2012, that she had tendered her resignation to the Governor General with effect from January 18, 2013.

Later life 
On March 11, 2018, it was announced that the new middle school in Lethbridge, Alberta would be named after Fairbairn.  It was named Senator Joyce Fairbairn Middle School, and opened in the fall of 2018.

Joyce Fairbairn died in Lethbridge on March 29, 2022, at the age of 82.

Honours

Commonwealth honours

Scholastic

 Honorary Degrees

References

External links

Liberal Senate Forum

1939 births
2022 deaths
Canadian senators from Alberta
Liberal Party of Canada senators
Women members of the Senate of Canada
Members of the 26th Canadian Ministry
Women government ministers of Canada
Members of the King's Privy Council for Canada
People from Lethbridge
University of Alberta alumni
Carleton University alumni
Women in Alberta politics
People with Alzheimer's disease
Members of the Order of Canada
20th-century Canadian women politicians
21st-century Canadian women politicians